Alfredo Duvergel (born April 2, 1968) is a Cuban boxer. He won the silver medal in the men's light middleweight (– 71 kg) category at the 1996 Summer Olympics in Atlanta.

Career
He lost the World championship finals against Romanian Francisc Vastag and had to settle for silver medals in 1995 and 1993.

At the Pan American Games in Mar del Plata, he captured the gold medal in his division.

1996 Summer Olympics
 Defeated Jozef Gilewski (Poland) 10-2
 Defeated Serhiy Horodnichov (Ukraine) 15-2
 Defeated Antonio Perugino (Italy) 15-8
 Defeated Yermakhan Ibraimov (Kazakhstan) 28-19
 Lost to David Reid (United States) KO by 3 (0:36)

He finally won the World Amateur Boxing Championships in 1997, after Vastag had ended his career.

References

1968 births
Living people
Boxers at the 1995 Pan American Games
Boxers at the 1996 Summer Olympics
Olympic boxers of Cuba
Olympic silver medalists for Cuba
Sportspeople from Guantánamo
Olympic medalists in boxing
Cuban male boxers
AIBA World Boxing Championships medalists
Medalists at the 1996 Summer Olympics
Pan American Games gold medalists for Cuba
Pan American Games medalists in boxing
Central American and Caribbean Games gold medalists for Cuba
Competitors at the 1990 Central American and Caribbean Games
Light-middleweight boxers
Central American and Caribbean Games medalists in boxing
Medalists at the 1995 Pan American Games